Amdang may refer to:
Amdang people
Amdang language